John Hopkins Noel (February 6, 1888 – November 4, 1939) was an American sport shooter who competed in the 1924 Summer Olympics. He was born and died in Nashville, Tennessee. In 1924, he won the gold medal as member of the American team in the team clay pigeons competition.

References

1888 births
1939 deaths
American male sport shooters
Shooters at the 1924 Summer Olympics
Olympic gold medalists for the United States in shooting
Trap and double trap shooters
Olympic medalists in shooting
Medalists at the 1924 Summer Olympics
19th-century American people
20th-century American people